Washermanpet Metro station is a Metro railway station on Line 1 of the Chennai Metro. The station is one among the 17 stations along Blue Line (Chennai Metro) of the Chennai Metro. The station serves the neighbourhoods of Washermanpet and Royapuram.

History

Construction

The station

Structure
Washermanpet is an underground Metro station situated on Blue Line (Chennai Metro).

Station layout

Facilities
List of available ATM at Washermanpet metro station are

Connectivity

Bus
 Mint (Vallalar Nagar) Bus Terminus

Rail
 Washermanpet railway station

Entry/Exit

See also

 Chennai
 Washermanpet railway station
 Washermanpet
 List of Chennai metro stations
 Chennai Metro
 Railway stations in Chennai
 Chennai Mass Rapid Transit System
 Chennai Monorail
 Chennai Suburban Railway
 Transport in Chennai
 Urban rail transit in India
 List of metro systems

References

External links
 

 UrbanRail.Net – descriptions of all metro systems in the world, each with a schematic map showing all stations.

Chennai Metro stations
Railway stations in Chennai